Libertad F.C., full name Libertad Futbol Club, was a professional soccer team in La Libertad, La Libertad, El Salvador.

History
In 1946, Libertad F.C. won their first and only national title, defeating Oriental Zone winners C.D. Luis Ángel Firpo and Occidental Zone winners Once Municipal in a national final round tournament. Libertad F.C. were the Central Zone winners. In the final round, they won three games, defeating C.D. Luis Ángel Firpo twice and Once Municipal once. The final scheduled game vs. Once Municipal that tournament was not played due to irrelevance of the game, having already clinched the national title. In the 1948–49 national season league, Libertad F.C. finished runners-up, with a record of 14 wins, 8 draws and 2 losses.

Other Stadiums
Estadio San Mathias

Achievements
Primera División de Fútbol Profesional: 
 Winners (1): 1946
 Runners-up (1): 1948–49

Former Coaches
 Manolo Amador (1942)
 Aníbal Ñeco Varela (Player/coach) (1947-1949)

References

External links

Defunct football clubs in El Salvador
Association football clubs disestablished in 1950
Association football clubs established in 1930
1930 establishments in El Salvador